Contender may refer to:

Boats
 Contender (dinghy), type of sailing dinghy
 Columbia 24 Contender, an American sailboat design

Books
 The Contender (Lipsyte novel), a 1967 novel by Robert Lipsyte
 The Contenders, a 2008 guide to the American presidential election with contributions by Laura Flanders and Dan Savage
 The Gemini Contenders, a 1976 novel by Robert Ludlum

Films
 The Contender (1944 film), a film directed by Sam Newfield
 The Contender (1993 film), a TV movie directed by Lou Antonio
 The Contender (2000 film), a film starring Gary Oldman, Joan Allen, and Jeff Bridges
 Series 7: The Contenders, a 2001 film directed by Daniel Minahan

Firearms
 Thompson/Center Contender, single shot, break-action firearm made as a pistol or rifle, manufactured by Thompson Center Arms

Television
 The Contender (TV series), a 2005 boxing-based reality television series or its spinoffs
The Contenders, a 2011 C-SPAN series about influential American presidential nominees
The Contenders, a 2004 Australian television program presented by Liz Jackson

Music
Contenders, a 1999 album by Valdy 
Contenders, a 1986 album by Easterhouse
The Contenders (band), and their self-titled 1989 debut album
 Contender (album), a 2012 album by American pop punk band Forever Came Calling

Songs
 "The Contender", a song by Menahan Street Band on the 2008 album Make the Road by Walking
 "Contender", a song by The Pains of Being Pure at Heart on their 2009 self-titled album The Pains of Being Pure at Heart
"Contenders" (song), a song by Heaven 17
"The Contender", by Irish songwriter Jimmy MacCarthy about Irish boxer Jack Doyle
"The Contenders", a song by The Kinks on their 1970 album Lola Versus Powerman and the Moneygoround, Part One

Plants
 A variety of green beans

Games
 The Contender: The Game of Presidential Debate, a political debate-themed party game using cards.

See also
 Contend
 Contenda